The 1939 season was the twenty-eighth season for Santos FC.

References

External links
Official Site 

Santos
1939
1939 in Brazilian football